Bratty v Attorney-General for Northern Ireland [1963] AC 386, [1961] 3 All ER 523, [1961] UKHL 3 is a House of Lords decision relating to non-insane automatism. The court decided that medical evidence is needed to prove that the defendant was not aware of what they were doing, and if this is available, the burden of proof lies with the prosecution to prove that intention was present.

Facts
In March 1961, twenty-year-old George Bratty had given a lift in his car to Josephine Fitzsimmons, who was later found dead under a hedge near Hillsborough, County Down, Northern Ireland, having been strangled. Bratty was later interviewed by police and asked to explain scratches on his neck. e made a statement in which he said, inter alia  and then

Trial
Bratty's trial was heard at the Downpatrick Assizes, and his defence team proposed alternative verdicts, namely
That Bratty was not guilty on the basis that he was in a state of automatism and not "master of his own actions", the only cause suggested for this being psychomotor epilepsy.
that if the jury rejected the first defence, Bratty's mental condition was so impaired and confused and he was so deficient in reason that he was not capable of forming the necessary intent for murder, and that the verdict should instead be manslaughter.
that if the jury were unable to come to either the first or second verdict, the accused may be guilty but insane on the ground that he did not know the nature and quality of his acts, or if he did, that he did not know that they were wrong.
The judge refused to allow the first two defences to be considered by the jury, and accordingly gave a direction only on the issue of insanity. The jury rejected this defence, and Bratty was convicted. He appealed against the judge's refusal to allow consideration of the first two defences.

Appeals
The Court of Criminal Appeal in Northern Ireland considered that automatism meant  It was ruled that the judge had been correct not to allow the first defence argument to go before the jury because it relied on a "disease of the mind" within the M'Naghten Rules, and that whether insanity or automatism  was in issue, the burden of proof would be upon the defendant. Bratty appealed further against these decisions.

References
Judgment: 

Criminal law of Northern Ireland
1961 in British law
Lord Denning cases
House of Lords cases
1961 in case law